Löcknitz is a municipality in the Vorpommern-Greifswald district, in Mecklenburg-Vorpommern, in north-eastern Germany, located in the historic region of Pomerania,  west of the German-Polish border and  west of Szczecin.

Cross-border contacts 

Since 1992 the bilingual German-Polish Gymnasium is visited by pupils from Germany (526 in 2008) and Poland (161), leading to the German Abitur as well as to the Polish matura. In 2008 the certificates were handed over by the foreign ministers of both countries Frank-Walter Steinmeier and Radosław Sikorski. Since Poland joined the Schengen Agreement, the population of Löcknitz is growing, as rates and costs of land acquisition are lower than in Poland. Many commuters from Szczecin live in Löcknitz  and the first economical investments are made in Löcknitz by Polish enterprises, supported by the Löcknitz administration. As of 2012, the town's population was 7% Polish.

Population

Notable residents 
Viktor Bauer (1915–1969), pilot

Twin towns 
  Sassenberg, North Rhine-Westphalia
  Stare Czarnowo, Poland

References

External links 

German-Polish school Löcknitz (German/Polish)

Vorpommern-Greifswald